Palestine National Archives is the official national archives of the State of Palestine and the Palestinian National Authority. The archives are maintained by the Palestinian Ministry of Culture and are located in Ramallah.

External links
 Official website of Palestine National Archives (Arabic)
 "Palestinian archives remain scattered", Al-Monitor

Government of the State of Palestine
National archives
Archives in the State of Palestine